Maroofganj, also spelled Marufganj, is a residential neighborhood under the jurisdiction of the Kotwali thana of Gaya, Bihar, India. In close proximity to the Gaya Junction railway station, it is one of the oldest and among the most crime-infested localities in the town. The area is known for landmarks such as Urdu Girls High School and Nala Road.

Etymology 
Maroofganj derives its name from the Arabic word al-maʿrūf (Arabic: مَعْرُوف, lit. acknowledged or right) and Middle Persian word ganj (Persian: , lit. treasured place or neighborhood).

Water pollution 
Besides its high crime rate, Maroofganj is also unpopular in Gaya for its poor sewerage infrastructure where residents see occasional and regular overflows especially in the area surrounding Nala Road (Hindi: नाला रोड, lit. 'drainage road').

References 

Gaya, India